Phthiotis Province was one of the provinces of the Phthiotis Prefecture, Greece. Its territory corresponded with that of the current municipalities Lamia, Makrakomi, and Stylida. It was abolished in 2006.

References

Provinces of Greece
Phthiotis